Sam Bond (born 6 December 1983 in Christchurch, England) is an English amateur natural bodybuilder, weightlifter and television personality who has competed for the British National Bodybuilding Federation and the National Physiques Competition.

Biography
He attended St. Peter's School and spent summers as an RNLI lifeguard before going on to have a career as a fundraiser.

In 2006, he came third in the national championships behind two professional bodybuilders. He is one of the highest ranked amateur natural bodybuilders.

Bond starred as Atlas in the 2008–9 revival of cult British television series Gladiators. His favourite events were Hang Tough and Gauntlet. Then from late 2009 to early 2010 he starred, at the Mayflower Theatre, in the pantomime Santa Claus and the Return of Jack Frost as Thaw the Glaciator.

In 2010 he appeared as the saxophone player in the Crunchie Rocks advert.

In America he has found fame as a book cover model for romance writers.

References

External links
 
Official Gladiators Site
Atlas - The Official Website
Sam Bond - The Official Website

1984 births
Living people
English bodybuilders
People educated at St Peter's School, York
People from Christchurch, Dorset
Sportspeople from Dorset
Romance cover models
Gladiators (1992 British TV series)